The Perry Lindsley House is located in Neenah, Wisconsin. It was added to both the State and the National Register of Historic Places in 2003.

References

Houses on the National Register of Historic Places in Wisconsin
National Register of Historic Places in Winnebago County, Wisconsin
Houses in Winnebago County, Wisconsin
Shingle Style architecture in Wisconsin
Limestone buildings in the United States
Houses completed in 1893